The Alvord Desert is a desert located in Harney County, in southeastern Oregon in the Western United States. It is roughly southeast of  Steens Mountain. The Alvord Desert is a  dry lake bed and averages  of rain a year. Two mountain ranges separate it from the Pacific Ocean—the Coast Range, and the Cascade Mountains. Along with Steens Mountain, these topographical features create a rain shadow.

During the dry season the surface is sufficiently flat for driving or landing small aircraft. Vehicle driving attempts to score land speed records are performed on the dry lake bed.

The nearest community is Fields, Oregon.

Name
The desert is named after General Benjamin Alvord, who served as commander of the U.S. Army's Department of Oregon during the American Civil War.

Climate

The Alvord Desert experiences a cold desert climate (Köppen BWk). The area receives very little rainfall throughout the year due to the rain shadow created by the Coast and Cascade mountain ranges as well the adjacent Steens Mountain.

Winter
Winter temperatures in the Alvord Basin are moderated through airflow from the south that stops the temperature from dropping too heavily. While many areas in the Oregon High Desert frequently dip below  through the winter months, the Alvord Desert rarely sees these frigid temperatures. The basin sees a moderate amount of its rainfall in the winter months from storms coming off the Pacific Ocean while the strong winter jet stream is aimed at the Pacific Northwest. Storms that are strong enough to bring moisture to the Southeastern area of Oregon are usually related to tropical storms feeding from the Hawaiian Islands. Snow does sometimes occur in the rare instances when cold air from the arctic to the north meets a strong flow of moisture from the Pacific to the West.

Spring
Spring is when the bulk of precipitation falls from thunderstorms. These storms attribute to the rainfall in April, May, and June that form in the south and move their way north across the desert and surrounding sagebrush plains. This warming can help trigger thunderstorms in combination with the unstable spring atmosphere. Rainfall turns the playa into a small lake, and for a short time, makes travel across it difficult.

Summer
Summer in the Alvord Desert has some of the hottest temperatures in the state of Oregon. High pressure sets in over the Pacific Northwest and the jet stream pushes north into Canada. This high pressure means very little precipitation, averaging less than  throughout the summer months. Night-time lows vary, with overnight temperatures dropping down between  throughout much of the basin.

Fall
Fall is also one of the driest times of the year.

Geology
Three primary geothermal areas are along the western edge as well as cold springs following NE to SW trending normal faults. On the western edge of the desert is Alvord Hot Springs. At the north is Mickey Hot Springs: an assortment of bubbling mud, pools and, the occasional geyser. At the south is Borax Lake which is a thermal spring complex. To the east is an unnamed  natural hot spring, one of 40 or more along  of the Alvord fault. Several of the geothermal features in Alvord Desert Basin have been examined by a team of scientists and geologists from the University of Idaho, Boise State University, and Idaho State University.

Fauna
Despite the barren nature of the playa, some opportunities for wildlife observation exist. Wild horses sometimes drink from the springs on the eastern edge of the desert. In areas where natural hot springs flow into the playa, especially around the Alvord Hot Springs, one can usually find nesting long-billed curlew.  Further out into the playa proper are numerous killdeer and snowy plover, along with the occasional American avocet. The outlet waters from the springs typically flow roughly one mile into the desert, and their reach roughly delineates the bird habitat. The nearby Steens Mountain Wilderness contains populations of bighorn sheep, mule deer, elk, and pronghorn. Further west is the Malheur National Wildlife Refuge, which is popular for birding.

Land speed record
The previous women's Land Speed Record was set at Alvord Desert by Kitty O'Neil, in the jet-powered SMI Motivator, in 1976. O'Neil reached .

Gallery

References

External links

 Alvord Desert - Bureau of Land Management
 
 The Wilderness Society: Wilderness in Oregon’s High Desert
 Alvord Desert Gliders  Video produced by Oregon Field Guide

Deserts of Oregon
Great Basin deserts
Deserts and xeric shrublands in the United States
Geography of Harney County, Oregon
Bureau of Land Management areas in Oregon
Protected areas of Harney County, Oregon